Euceramia is a genus of fungi in the family Chaetothyriaceae.

References

External links
Euceramia at Index Fungorum

Eurotiomycetes
Eurotiomycetes genera